Thomas Francis Lillis (March 3, 1861 – December 29, 1938) was an American prelate of the Roman Catholic Church. He served as bishop of the Diocese of Leavenworth in  Kansas (1905–1910) and as bishop of the Diocese of Kansas City in Missouri (1913–1938).

Biography

Early life 
One of eleven children, Thomas Lillis was born in Lexington, Missouri, to James and Margaret (née Jordan) Lillis. His parents were both Irish immigrants; his mother was born in County Cork while his father was from County Clare and worked as a railroad contractor and later police commissioner of Kansas City under Governor Meredith Marmaduke.

He attended public schools in Lafayette County before studying at Niagara University in New York, from where he obtained a Bachelor of Arts degree. He completed his theological studies at St. Benedict College in Atchison, Kansas.

Priesthood 
At age 24, Lillis was ordained to the priesthood by Bishop John Joseph Hogan on August 15, 1885. He then served as a curate in Shackleford until 1887, when he became pastor of Westport. He was rector of St. Patrick's Church in Kansas City from 1888 to 1904. He also served as vicar general of the Diocese of Kansas City.

Bishop of Leavenworth 
On October 24, 1904, Lillis was appointed the second Bishop of Leavenworth, Kansas, by Pope Pius X. He received his episcopal consecration on the following December 27 from Archbishop John J. Glennon, with Bishops John Hogan and John Francis Cunningham serving as co-consecrators. He was installed at the Cathedral of Leavenworth on January 2, 1905. During his tenure, he established several new congregations, churches, and parochial schools.

Coadjutor Bishop and Bishop of Kansas City 
At the request of the clergy of Missouri, Lillis was named Coadjutor Bishop of Kansas City and Titular Bishop of Cibyra on March 14, 1910. He later succeeded Bishop Hogan as the second Bishop of Kansas City upon the latter's death on February 21, 1913. He delivered the prayer at the second session of the 1928 Republican National Convention.

In 1933, Lillis drafted a resolution signed by his fellow Catholic bishops in an effort to end lynchings. In 1935 he was appointed an assistant at the pontifical throne by Pope Pius XI. He served at Kansas City for twenty-five years, until his death at age 77.

References

1861 births
1938 deaths
People from Lexington, Missouri
American Roman Catholic clergy of Irish descent
Niagara University alumni
Roman Catholic bishops of Leavenworth
Roman Catholic bishops of Kansas City
20th-century Roman Catholic bishops in the United States
Catholics from Missouri